This is the complete list of men's World Championships medalists in short-course swimming from 1993 to 2021.

50 metre freestyle

100 metre freestyle

200 metre freestyle

400 metre freestyle

800 metre freestyle

1500 metre freestyle

50 metre backstroke

100 metre backstroke

200 metre backstroke

50 metre breaststroke

100 metre breaststroke

200 metre breaststroke

50 metre butterfly

100 metre butterfly

200 metre butterfly

100 metre individual medley

200 metre individual medley

400 metre individual medley

4 × 50 metre freestyle relay

4 × 100 metre freestyle relay

4 × 200 metre freestyle relay

4 × 50 metre medley relay

4 × 100 metre medley relay

4 × 50 metre mixed freestyle relay

4 × 50 metre mixed medley relay

See also
List of World Swimming Championships (25 m) medalists (women)

References
HistoFINA FINA WORLD SWIMMING CHAMPIONSHIPS (25m) MEDALLISTS AND STATISTICS

FINA World Swimming Championships (25 m)
World Short Course Swimming Championships (men)
World Short Course Swimming Championships